Zac Purton (born 3 January 1983) is a horse racing jockey. He won the Brisbane jockeys' premiership as an apprentice in 2003, moved to Sydney and was quickly amongst the top jockeys there before he began his Hong Kong career in 2007/08. In the 2013/14 season, Purton ended the 13-year championship reign of Douglas Whyte, becoming the first Australian jockey to win the Hong Kong title since Noel Barker in 1991. . (112 wins). He notched up 112 wins on his way to the title. Purton also raced to what was then the fastest 50 in Hong Kong history that season and became the second rider, after Whyte, to notch 100 wins in a season. Purton lost his title when he came second to João Moreira in 2014/15 with 95 wins then was runner-up to his Brazilian rival again in 2015-16 and 2016-17 before reclaiming the Hong Kong championship in 2017-18 in an epic battle. 
With 854 career wins as a jockey in Hong Kong, Purton sits third on the list behind Whyte (1,791) and Anthony S. "Tony" Cruz (946).
He represented Hong Kong in the World Super Jockey Series held by Japan Racing Association in 2012, recording two wins and being crowned as champion. He won the prestigious Hong Kong Derby in 2015, with the John Size-trained Luger, and his Hong Kong Cup win on Time Warp in 2017 made Purton only the third jockey, after Gerald Mosse and Moreira, to have won all four of Hong Kong's December international races.

Major wins 
 Australia
G1 AJC Sires' Produce Stakes - Excites (2006), Yankee Rose (2016)
G1 Chipping Norton Stakes - He's No Pie Eater (2007)
G1 Canterbury Stakes - Artorius (2023)
G1 Randwick Guineas - Communist (2023)
G1 Epsom Handicap - Theseo (2008)
G1 Doncaster Handicap - Sacred Falls (2014), It's Somewhat (2017)
G1 George Main Stakes - Sacred Falls (2014)
G1 Caulfield Cup - Admire Rakti (2014)
G1 The_J._J._Atkins - Sacred Elixir (2016)

 Great Britain
G1 King's Stand Stakes - Little Bridge (2012)

 Hong Kong
HKG1 Stewards' Cup  - Fellowship (2010)
HKG1 Hong Kong Gold Cup - Military Attack (2013)
HKG1 Queen's Silver Jubilee Cup - Ambitious Dragon (2013)
G1 Hong Kong Cup - Time Warp (2017), Normcore (2020)
G1 Hong Kong Vase - Dominant (2013), Exultant (2018)
G1 Hong Kong Mile - Ambitious Dragon (2012), Beauty Only (2016), Beauty Generation (2018), California Spangle (2022)
G1 Hong Kong Sprint - Aerovelocity (2014), Aerovelocity (2016)
HKG1 Hong Kong Classic Cup - California Spangle (2022)
HKG1 Hong Kong Derby - Luger (2015)
HKG1 Centenary Sprint Cup - Aerovelocity (2016), Lucky Sweynesse (2023)
G1 Stewards' Cup  - Beauty Generation (2019), Waikuku (2022)
G1 Hong Kong Gold Cup - Time Warp (2018), Exultant (2019)
G1 Hong Kong Champions & Chater Cup - Exultant (2019)
G1 Queen's Silver Jubilee Cup - Beauty Generation (2018, 2019, 2020)
G1 Chairman's Sprint Prize - Ivictory (2018)
G1 Champions Mile - Beauty Generation (2018, 2019)

 Japan
G1 Takamatsunomiya Kinen - Aerovelocity (2015)

 Singapore
G1 Singapore Airlines International Cup - Military Attack (2013)
G1 KrisFlyer International Sprint - Aerovelocity (2015)
G1 Kranji Mile - Southern Legend (2018, 2019)

Performance at the Hong Kong Jockey Club

References

The Hong Kong Jockey Club

Hong Kong jockeys
Australian jockeys
Living people
1983 births
Hong Kong people of Australian descent